Barjik (died 731) was a Khazar prince who flourished in the early 8th century.  He is described by al-Tabari as "the son of the Khagan"; his exact status and position is unknown though he may have been the Bek.

Barjik led the Khazar armies in the Khazar-Arab wars of the early 8th century. In 730, he won a victory at the Battle of Marj Ardabil, sacking and occupying the city. He killed the Arab general al-Jarrah al-Hakami and mounted the latter's head on his throne as a trophy. This enraged the Umayyad troops who faced him the following year outside of Mosul, and Barjik was defeated and slain in the ensuing battle.

Sources
 
 

731 deaths
Khazar generals
People of the Arab–Khazar wars
8th-century people
Year of birth unknown